Bouanri is a town and arrondissement in the Borgou Department of  Benin. It is an administrative division under the jurisdiction of the commune of Bembèrèkè. According to the population census conducted by the Institut National de la Statistique Benin on February 15, 2002, the arrondissement had a total population of 19,281.

References

Populated places in the Borgou Department
Arrondissements of Benin